Eli ben Yehudah ha Nazir ben Zechariah, Arabic Abu Kathir Yahya al Katib ("Father of Kathir, Yahya the Scribe", fl. Tiberias, 910s)  was a grammarian and philologist of the Hebrew, Arabic and Aramaic languages. He may have been among the teachers in Tiberias of Saadia.

His Arabic language treatise is entitled Usul al-Lugha al-'ibraniyya (c. 915) أصول اللغة العبرانيّة ("Origins of the Hebrew language"). He also commented on the opinion regarding the dagesh pronunciation of the Hebrew letter Resh as articulated by the Mazya community among earlier mesorah masters of Tiberias (c. 775-825).

References

People from Tiberias
Grammarians of Hebrew
Grammarians of Aramaic
Grammarians of Arabic
10th-century rabbis